Salema Kasdaoui (born 25 November 1984) is a Tunisian professional footballer who plays as a forward.

External links
 
 

1984 births
Living people
People from Dahmani
Tunisian footballers
Association football forwards
Tunisia international footballers
2011 African Nations Championship players
Cypriot First Division players
Jendouba Sport players
Espérance Sportive de Tunis players
APEP FC players
Stade Tunisien players
JS Kairouan players
CS Sfaxien players
Club Africain players
CS Hammam-Lif players
AS Kasserine players
That Ras Club players
FC Nouadhibou players
Tunisian expatriate footballers
Tunisian expatriate sportspeople in Cyprus
Expatriate footballers in Cyprus
Tunisian expatriate sportspeople in Jordan
Expatriate footballers in Jordan
Expatriate footballers in Mauritania
Tunisia A' international footballers